The Ankara barbel or Sakarya barbel (Luciobarbus escherichii) is a species of cyprinid fish endemic to freshwater habitats in Turkey, where it occurs in the Sakarya drainage in the Asian part of the country.

References 

Cyprinid fish of Asia
Fish of Turkey
Fish described in 1897
Taxobox binomials not recognized by IUCN